Symkanieh ( Arabic: سمقانية ) is a town located in the Chouf District of Mount Lebanon Governorate, about 45 kilometres (28 mi) southeast of Beirut. Its altitude ranges between 850 m (2,790 ft) – 950 m (3,120 ft) high. Bordering Towns: Bakaata and Baakline.
Symkanieh was the seat house for Harmouche Family. It has ancient ruins for the Palace of Mahmoud Harmouche who governed Mount Lebanon before he was defeated by Emir Haidar Chehab in the Battle of Ain Dara

References

External links
 Semqaniyeh, Localiban

Populated places in Chouf District